Pô is a department or commune of Nahouri Province in southern Burkina Faso. Its capital is the city of Pô.

References 

Departments of Burkina Faso
Nahouri Province